The Zico Football Center (ZFC) is a sports complex in Rio de Janeiro, Brazil. It was founded in 1996 by Zico, and is the house of the ZFC Club – which competes on the B Series of the Rio State Championship. The club hosted the football tournament matches during the 2007 Pan American Games.

External links 
Rio 2007 Games website

Venues of the 2007 Pan American Games